Jeffrey Hulum III (born July 23, 1976) is an American politician who is currently serving in the Mississippi House of Representatives from Mississippi's 119th House of Representatives district, a district based in the city of Gulfport. He was elected in a 2022 special election. He is a member of the Democratic Party.

Early life
Hulum was born in Gulfport, Mississippi, on July 23, 1976.

Mississippi legislature
In the 2019 Mississippi House of Representatives election, Hulum unsuccessfully challenged incumbent Democrat Sonya Williams-Barnes in Mississippi's 119th House of Representatives district, losing in the Democratic primary.

In May 2022, Williams-Barnes resigned from the district to join the Southern Poverty Law Center, triggering a special election. The election was held on July 19, 2022. Hulum won against fellow Democrat Gary Fredericks by a large margin.

Electoral history

References

External links

Living people
1976 births
Democratic Party members of the Mississippi House of Representatives
People from Gulfport, Mississippi
21st-century American politicians